Haplogroup C-M8  also known as Haplogroup C1a1 is a Y-chromosome haplogroup. It is one of two branches of Haplogroup C1a, one of the descendants of Haplogroup C-M130.

It has been found in about 6% (2.3% to 16.7%) of modern males sampled in Japan and has been considered to be a Y-DNA haplogroup descended from Jōmon people. Elsewhere, it has been observed among academic studies only in one individual in a sample collected on Jeju Island of South Korea and in commercial testing in one individual who has reported an origin in Liaoning province of China and one individual who has reported an origin in Seoul, South Korea.

The MRCA with its sister haplogroup C-V20 dates back to 40,000 to 50,000 years ago. Diffusion of existing subtypes of C-M8 is estimated to have begun about 12,000 years ago.

C1a1 is found in the Jōmon people and are linked  to the Jomon people who came from the south route.

Frequency in Japan
Frequency in samples of Japanese from various regions:

Okinawa 9.0% (4.4% - 16.7%)
Kagawa? 8.5%
Tokyo 7.1% 
Miyazaki 6.5% (0/29 = 0% Misato to 2/8 = 25% Aya, or 28/291 = 9.6% Western Miyazaki, 22/349 = 6.3% Northern Miyazaki, 27/488 = 5.5% Central Miyazaki, 6/141 = 4.3% Southern Miyazaki)
Tokushima 6.3% (5.7% - 10.0%)
Osaka 6.2%
Fukuoka 5.9%
Kawasaki 5.6%
Shizuoka 4.9%
Sapporo 4.1% (3.4% - 4.6%)
Kanazawa 4.0% (3.4% - 4.7%)
Aomori 3.8% (2.5% - 7.7%)
Nagasaki 3.3%
Saga 2.3%

History
Haplogroup C1a1 (M8) is mostly unique to the Japanese archipelago, and its migration route is enigmatic.

C1a1 is estimated to be one of the common haplogroups among the Jōmon people (about 30% or more), next to D1a2a, D1a1, C2, K, and F.

References

C-M8